Ice hockey at the 2011 Asian Winter Games was held in Astana (males) and Almaty (females) in Kazakhstan from 28 January to 6 February.

For these games, the men were competing in a 14-team tournament, and the women in a 5-team tournament. Ice hockey preliminaries actually started two days before the Opening Ceremony of the Games on 30 January.

For the first time ever, there were two divisions in the male competition so as to avoid one sided games seen at the last edition of the games. India and Qatar withdrew  and 12 nations competed in the Men's tournament. All games was played at the Kazakhstan Sports Palace (Arena 1 and 2) in Astana. Kyrgyzstan and Bahrain made their debuts at an international ice hockey tournament.

Schedule

Medalists

Medal table

Draw
The top division was consisted of five teams, North Korea withdrew and replaced by 2010 IIHF Challenge Cup of Asia winner Chinese Taipei.

Nine teams registered for the premier division.

Group A

*
*

Group B

 Athletes from Kuwait

Group C

* India and Qatar withdrew and the format changed into a round robin competition.

Final standing

Men

Women

References

External links
 IIHF - Ice hockey at the 2011 Asian Winter Games

 
2011 Asian Winter Games events
2011
2011
Asian
Winter
Ice hockey in Kazakhstan